XHABCA-FM/XEABCA-AM is a radio station in Mexicali, Baja California, Mexico, broadcasting on 101.3 FM and 820 AM. It is owned by Radio Cañón and is known as Radio Cañón.

History
XEABCA-AM began on 1590 kHz in 1984, when a concession was awarded for XEYX-AM, owned by Mario Ignacio Melendez Soto. Its first format was tropical music as "La Gigante".

In 1997, the station was sold to MVS Radio and rechristened XEMVS-AM. The concessionaire name for this station, Stereorey Mexicali, is a nod to MVS's Stereorey format; stations owned by MVS Radio have the concessionaire Stereorey México, S.A. In the 1990s, the station also slid down from 1590 kHz to 820. During MVS ownership, the station affiliated to the La Mejor regional Mexican national format, later becoming oldies-formatted Nostalgia 820 and grupera-formatted Radio Lobo.

In 2004, MVS sold the station to Organización Editorial Mexicana, which changed its calls to the current XEABCA-AM and brought its ABC Radio programming to Mexicali. OEM also bought XEMMM-AM 940 from Cadena Baja California.

After being approved in July 2017, XEABCA began its AM-FM migration in September 2020, signing on XHABCA-FM 101.3; the station formally added the FM on September 20. The station will be subject to a continuity obligation to keep the AM operational in order to provide service to 11 people who receive no other radio stations. In March 2022, it rebranded as Radio Cañón with no change in format.

References

External links
ABC Radio 820 AM Facebook

Radio stations in Mexicali
Radio stations in Mexico with continuity obligations
Radio stations established in 1984
1984 establishments in Mexico